Kelly Jane Metzger (born February 25, 1980) is a Canadian voice and theater actress.

Life and career
After making her debut in the title role of Anne of Green Gables, she performed on the stage with several Vancouver-based theatrical companies. After this, she began a career in voice acting. Among her more noted voice acting roles are the English voice of Sayu Yagami in the anime series based on the Death Note manga, the character of Buttercup in Powerpuff Girls Z, the voice of Spitfire in My Little Pony: Friendship Is Magic (excluding the episode "Sonic Rainboom", where she was voiced by Nicole Oliver), the voice of Nya in the Cartoon Network series Ninjago: Masters of Spinjitzu, and the voice of Sugar Sprinkles and Kora Dixon in Littlest Pet Shop. She also voiced Makena in Barbie: Thumbelina, Shimmer in Barbie: A Fashion Fairytale, Wickellia in Barbie: Princess Charm School and Allie in Barbie in A Mermaid Tale 2. Metzger also does the singing voice of the character Gloriosa Daisy in the 2016 film My Little Pony: Equestria Girls – Legend of Everfree and the voice of Petunia Petals in My Little Pony: Rainbow Roadtrip.

References

External links
Official website

1980 births
Living people
Canadian film actresses
Canadian stage actresses
Canadian television actresses
Canadian voice actresses